The Puma GTB was a front-engine, rear-wheel-drive touring car based on the  Brazilian GM Chevrolet Opala components. A prototype named the Puma GTO appeared in 1971. The name was changed to Puma GTB (Gran Turismo Brazil) for the first production version which appeared in 1973. Registers confirm that the Puma GTB was Brazil's most expensive car from 1973 to 1984. The GTB was powered by a 4100 cc in-line six-cylinder engine that was basically a U.S. Chevrolet six produced in Brazil. The body was made of fiberglass, which allowed for styling changes with minimal expense. It was common for GTB engines to be modified for high output. GTB interiors were luxurious, with features such as leather seats, power windows and air conditioning. Several aftermarket companies, including Pumakit and Superclar, produced custom body parts for the Puma GTB (the Daytona version).

Production of the GTB was lower than that of the VW based Pumas. Total production was 1,589 of which 701 were S1 (First Series) and 888 were S2 (Second Series). The Puma GTB was not exported to North America or Europe, although at least one S2 is known to be in the U.S.

There were also two other versions of the Puma GTB before the factory's debts led to their demise: the GTB S3 (late 1983), using Brazilian Sugarcane Alcohol as fuel with a 4L Chevrolet engine, and the S4 (1984), with a turbo-charged engine. But being of a rather outdated design and now competing in a market with relaxed import restrictions, neither version could sell as much as the S1 and S2 had. Puma Vehicles fell into bankruptcy in 1985. In 1987 Alfa Metais assumed production of Puma's cars, producing a facelifted GTB in very small numbers as the AMV until production ended for good in 1993.

Specifications
Engine – in-line six-cylinder; 4093 cc. Compression Rate: 7.8:1. Double-body carburetor. Horsepower:  @ 4.800 rpm. Maximum Torque: 32,5 kgf⋅m @ 2.600 rpm
Gearbox – manual, 4 gears; rear-wheel drive.
Suspension – front, independent; rear, hard axis with semi-elliptical springs.
Wheels – 14 inches; front tires, 205/70 R 14; rear tires, 215/70 R 14.
Dimensions – length, ; width, ; height, ; weight, .
Performance – Maximum speed: .
Estimated used car price – US$ 17000.00

Cars of Brazil
Rear-wheel-drive vehicles
Muscle cars

Cars introduced in 1973
1980s cars